Lewis Smith Lake is a reservoir in north Alabama. It is the deepest lake in Alabama.

The lake was created by Alabama Power with the construction of the Lewis Smith Dam. The name honors Lewis Martin Smith, president of Alabama Power from 1952 to 1957.

Nearby towns include Bremen, Cullman, Good Hope, Crane Hill and Dodge City in Cullman County; Curry and Jasper in Walker County; and Addison, Arley, Houston, and Double Springs.

Tourist attractions are: Indian head cliff jump (30 ft), Castle Rock (40–50 ft), and the Castle.

History
Due to the demand of coal along the Black Warrior River in the late nineteenth and early twentieth century, a series of locks and dams were added north of the city of Tuscaloosa. To better regulate the water levels in these locks and dams, local business leaders pressured the federal government to build a dam on the upper fork of the Sipsey Fork tributary of the Black Warrior River. The planned lake would also provide additional power to the surrounding area during peak hours as well as provide a source of recreational income to the otherwise sparsely populated area.

On July 27, 1954 Alabama power filed an application with the Federal Power commission for construction of the lake. For the first 20 years, the lake remained relatively undeveloped. During the 1980s and 1990s the lake saw a rapid growth in recreation due to its proximity to the cities of Birmingham and Huntsville.

Today the lake is used primarily for recreation, however during the summer its power plant is used during peak loads.

References

Bodies of water of Cullman County, Alabama
Reservoirs in Alabama
Bodies of water of Walker County, Alabama
Bodies of water of Winston County, Alabama
Dams in Alabama
Hydroelectric power plants in Alabama
Alabama Power dams
Dams completed in 1961
Protected areas of Cullman County, Alabama
Protected areas of Walker County, Alabama
Protected areas of Winston County, Alabama